This article contains lists of quasars. More than a million quasars have been observed, so any list on Wikipedia is necessarily a selection of them.

Proper naming of quasars are by Catalogue Entry, Qxxxx±yy using B1950 coordinates, or QSO Jxxxx±yyyy using J2000 coordinates. They may also use the prefix QSR. There are currently no quasars that are visible to the naked eye.

List of quasars
This is a list of exceptional quasars for characteristics otherwise not separately listed

List of named quasars
This is a list of quasars, with a common name, instead of a designation from a survey, catalogue or list.

List of multiply imaged quasars
This is a list of quasars that as a result of gravitational lensing appear as multiple images on Earth.

List of visual quasar associations
This is a list of double quasars, triple quasars, and the like, where quasars are close together in line-of-sight, but not physically related.

List of physical quasar groups
This is a list of binary quasars, trinary quasars, and the like, where quasars are physically close to each other.

Large Quasar Groups

Large quasar groups (LQGs) are bound to a filament of mass, and not directly bound to each other.

List of quasars with apparent superluminal jet motion
This is a list of quasars with jets that appear to be superluminal due to relativistic effects and line-of-sight orientation. Such quasars are sometimes referred to as superluminal quasars.

Quasars that have a recessional velocity greater than the speed of light (c) are very common. Any quasar with z > 1 is receding faster than c, while z exactly equal to 1 indicates recession at the speed of light. Early attempts to explain superluminal quasars resulted in convoluted explanations with a limit of z = 2.326, or in the extreme z < 2.4. The majority of quasars lie between z = 2 and z = 5.

Firsts

Extremes

First quasars found

Most distant quasars

In 1964 a quasar became the most distant object in the universe for the first time. Quasars would remain the most distant objects in the universe until 1997, when a pair of non-quasar galaxies would take the title (galaxies CL 1358+62 G1 & CL 1358+62 G2 lensed by galaxy cluster CL 1358+62).

In cosmic scales distance is usually indicated by redshift (denoted by z) which is a measure of recessional velocity and inferred distance due to cosmological expansion.

Most powerful quasars

See also
List of microquasars
Lists of astronomical objects
List of galaxies
List of black holes

References

External links
Interactive interface into the catalog of Quasars from the Sloane Digital Sky Survey
Catalogue of Bright Quasars and BL Lacertae Objects
Kitt Peak Quasar List (1975) VII/11
Revised and Updated Catalog of Quasi-stellar Objects (1993) VII/158

Quasars